Anhedral may refer to: 

 Anhedral angle, the downward angle from horizontal of the wings or tailplane of a fixed-wing aircraft
 Anhedral (petrology), a rock texture without crystal faces or cross-section shape in thin section